The 2014–15 season was Ayr United's 2nd season in League One and their 3rd consecutive season in the third-tier of Scottish football. Ayr also competed in the Scottish Cup, League Cup and the Challenge Cup.

Summary

Management
Ayr began the season under the management of Mark Roberts, who continued to operate in a player-manager role. On 15 December, Roberts was removed from his position as manager after a poor run of form, with his assistant Andy Millen placed in temporary charge. On 5 January 2015, Ian McCall was appointed as Ayr United's new manager.

Competitions

Pre season

Scottish League One

Scottish League Cup

Scottish Cup

Scottish Challenge Cup

Player statistics

Squad, appearance and goals

Players with a zero in every column only appeared as unused substitutes.

League table

Overall

Last Updated: 3 September 2015

Results summary

Results by round

Transfers

Players in

Players out

References

Ayr United F.C. seasons
Ayr United F.C.